Daniel Petru Huza (born 24 June 1970) is a Romanian former footballer who played as a midfielder mainly for Jiul Petroșani, but also for teams such as Minerul Lupeni, Bihor Oradea or Pandurii Târgu Jiu, among others. According to other sources, Huza played in 95 Liga I matches and scored 15 goals, but also in 200 Liga II matches and scored 56 goals.

After retirement, Huza continued to work for his favourite club, Jiul Petroșani, at the beginning as a coach in the youth center, subsequently being promoted as an assistant coach in the Liga II. In 2011 Huza was promoted as the manager of Jiul, in a tough moment for the club, after it was relegated in the Liga IV due to financial problems. Huza promoted Jiul and next season continued as the manager of the second squad, remaining in the 4th tier. After a short spell at Universitatea Cluj, Huza moved in 2014 in the United Arab Emirates where he continued as a youth coach and technical director for Al Dhafra, Sharjah FC and Al Ain.

Honours

Player
Jiul Petroșani
Divizia B: Winner (1) 1995–96
Divizia C: Winner (1) 2002–03

Minerul Lupeni
Divizia C: Winner (1) 1995–96

Manager
Jiul Petroșani
Liga IV – Hunedoara County: Winner (1) 2010–11

References

External links
 

1970 births
Living people
People from Târnăveni
Romanian footballers
Association football midfielders
Liga I players
Liga II players
CSM Jiul Petroșani players
CS Minerul Lupeni players
CSM Reșița players
FC Bihor Oradea players
FCV Farul Constanța players
CS Pandurii Târgu Jiu players
CS Minerul Motru players
Romanian football managers
CSM Jiul Petroșani managers
Romanian expatriate sportspeople in the United Arab Emirates
Expatriate football managers in the United Arab Emirates